Amphimallon volgense is a species of beetle in the Melolonthinae subfamily that can be found in southern part of Russia and the Near East.

References

Beetles described in 1823
volgense
Beetles of Asia